Modicella is a genus of fungi in the Mortierellaceae in the family of the Mucoromycota. It was formerly in the family Zygomycota. The genus contains two species found in North and South America and one in New Zealand.

References

External links

Zygomycota genera